Edward Hyde (18 March 1881 – 9 October 1941) was an English cricketer who played for Northamptonshire. He was born in Earls Barton and died in Cambridge.

Hyde made a single first-class appearance, during the 1907 season, against Kent. From the tailend, he scored 3 runs in the first innings in which he batted, and a duck in the second innings. Northamptonshire lost the match by an innings margin.

Hyde took two catches during the match.

External links 
 Edward Hyde at Cricket Archive 

1881 births
1941 deaths
English cricketers
Northamptonshire cricketers
People from Earls Barton